Cassie Newland is a British archaeologist, public historian and academic. She is Senior Lecturer in Cultural Heritage and Director of the Cultural Heritage Institute at RAU Swindon. She was previously Senior Lecturer in Heritage and Public History at Bath Spa University and Research Associate at King's College London. She regularly appears on historical and science broadcast media as a resident expert, including Time Team, Time Crashers, and Coast.

Education and interests 
Cassie Newland completed her Masters in Historical Archaeology and PhD in Archaeology in at the University of Bristol. Her research specialisms include nineteenth century technological colonialism, slavery and the Atlantic world, and industrial and contemporary archaeology. Her other historical interests include mobile phones, telegraphy, wireless and radar.

In 2016, Newland was curator for the exhibition Victorians Decoded: Art & Telegraphy at the Guildhall Art Gallery, London. It included a manifestation of The Great Automatic Grammatizator, a fictional machine invited by author Roald Dahl.

Broadcast 

Newland has been a presenter and contributor on a variety of television and radio programmes. She has received awards for the public presentation of science.

Selected works

Articles 

 Bailey, G, Newland, C, Nilsson, A and Schofield, J (2009). 'Transit, transition: excavating J641 VUJ.' Cambridge Archaeological Journal, 19 (1). pp. 1–28.
 Schofield, J, Newland, C, Bailey, G and Nilsson, A (2009). 'Sic transit gloria mundi.' British Archaeology, 92. pp. 16–21.

Chapters 

 Newland, C (2020) 'Economic objects.' In: White, C.L, ed. A cultural history of objects: in the age of industry - volume 5. Bloomsbury, London, pp. 57–76.
Newland, C (2016) Sections on 'Chatterton's Compound', 'Gutta percha', 'Telegraphic Copper', 'The Marine Galvanometer', 'Sir Charles Wheatstone's Notes', '1866: The Year Communication Changed Forever'. In: Arscott, C., & Pettit, C. ed Exhibition catalogue for the exhibition Victorians Decoded: Art and Telegraphy. London: The Courtauld Institute of Art & King’s College London.
 Newland, C (2012) 'Mr Hopgood's Shed: an archaeology of Bishop’s Cannings wireless station’ in Beyond the Dead Horizon: Studies in 20th-Century Conflict Archaeology, Nicholas Saunders (ed.).  British Archaeological Reports.  Archaeopress, Oxford.
Newland, C (2009) 'Marconi's first transatlantic wireless transmission.' In: Schofield, J, ed. Defining moments: dramatic archaeologies of the twentieth-century. Archaeopress (BAR), Oxford, pp. 9–18.

Excavations 

 2009. Turbo Island: an archaeology of Homelessness. Public archaeology project run as drop-in site for students and public alike. Part of a larger English Heritage funded project exploring the archaeology of contemporary homelessness.
 2006. The Van Project. The now infamous excavation of a 1991 Ford Transit van. Successful experimental exercise into the archaeology of vehicles.

References

External links 

 Cassie Newland, Bath Spa University

Year of birth missing (living people)
Living people
British women historians
British women archaeologists
British women television presenters
Public historians
Alumni of the University of Bristol
Academics of Bath Spa University